Field Marshal Musa Mwariama, EBS (1928–1989) was a Kenyan revolutionary leader of the Mau Mau in Meru and the highest-ranking Mau Mau leader who survived the war without being killed or captured. Together with Field Marshal Dedan Kimathi, they comprised the core Mau Mau leadership. Mwariama was the highest ranking leader among the Meru side of the uprising.

By the time he left his bases in Mount Kenya and Nyambene Hills on the equator, he had about 2,000 fighters who had survived Operation Anvil in Kenya. He was decorated with the national Order of  Elder of the Burning Spear (EBS) after independence. The most famous photograph of him is with President Jomo Kenyatta on attainment of Uhuru (independence) in 1963, and most of the postwar Mau Mau video clips show him inspecting a Mau Mau guard of honour or with President Jomo Kenyatta.

Early life 

M'Kiribua M'Muchiri, or Mbaringu, or Muthigari Mugathe, or Nkumbuku, or Field Marshall Mwariama was born in 1928 at Muthara in Tigania division of Meru District. According to Ameru tradition, his parents who had migrated from Nkuene in South Imenti, gave him the name Baringo. He had an older brother called Romano Ntabathia though from a different mother. Their father, M'Muchiri was a soothsayer and strict traditionalist.

Death 
Musa Mwariama died in 1989 at Ukambani after he sucked the leg of a friend who had been bitten by a venomous snake. He was buried at his 15-acre (6 ha) farm in Kiambogo Village, in Timau, North Buuri Constituency, Meru County.

References

External links 
In2EastAfrica: Dry tears of Mau Mau widows

1928 births
1989 deaths
Kenyan rebels
People of the Mau Mau Uprising
Elders of the Order of the Burning Spear